Tamkang University (TKU) is a private university in Tamsui District, New Taipei City, Taiwan. It was founded in 1950 as a junior college of English literature. Today it is a comprehensive university with 11 colleges that serves nearly 25,000 students on four campuses (three traditional, one online).

Tamkang University is Taiwan's oldest private institution of higher learning and ranked among the top 1,500 universities worldwide in the 2021 Best Global Universities Rankings by U.S. News & World Report. Over 28,000 students of 50 nationalities form a diverse student body. Tamkang has partnerships with over 100 sister universities in 28 countries. The university's main campus in historic Tamsui is noted for its scenery.

Casually, members of the university community call themselves 'Tamkangians.' Tamkang University is ranked 251–300 in English Language and Literature by QS World University Rankings in 2015.

History

Established in 1950 as a junior college of English, Tamkang first offered a two-year program and then a three-year program. It was not until 1958, after it was reorganized as a College of Arts and Sciences, that Tamkang awarded bachelor's degrees to its graduates. In 1980 Tamkang was elevated to the university status.

Today, Tamkang University has 11 colleges comprising 47 departments and divisions, 50 master's programs, and 17 doctoral programs. The total student enrollment is 28,075 and the number of faculty and staff members is 2,288.

The university has four campuses: the main campus in the Tamsui District of New Taipei City, the Taipei City campus, the Lanyang campus in Jiaoxi Township in Yilan County, and the online Cyber Campus.

Development
Tamkang University developed in four broad stages.
 The First Wave (1950–1980) is the Foundation Period, referring to the difficult times and hardships of Tamkang Junior College of English and those of Tamkang College of Arts and Sciences, adopting the policy of emphasizing "both quantity and quality."
 The Second Wave (1980–1996) marks the Positioning Period, referring to the period when Tamkang was elevated to the status of a university, emphasizing its policy of "quality over quantity."
 The Third Wave (1996–2005) signifies the Uplifting Period, referring to the university's forty-sixth founding anniversary, when the University Chueh-sheng Memorial Library was officially open, linking the university with international academic circles and marching toward the goal of becoming a first-rate world-class university.
 The Fourth Wave (2005–present) marks the Transitional Period, which started when Tamkang's third campus, the Lanyang Campus, first recruited its incoming students. A fourth campus has since been added.

Philosophy

The triple objectives of Globalization, Information-oriented Education, and Future-oriented Education are the foundation of Tamkang University's continuous management and development. Globalization is the spatial pattern of the future; Information-oriented Education, the life pattern of the future; and Future-oriented Education, the time frame of the future. The triple objectives are the time and spatial integration of Tamkang collective life system.

Globalization
Globalization is based on the concept that all of humanity shares one globe. Moreover, through languages, words, and cultures, humans communicate with one another to promote mutual understanding. We form a global living community because we have only one planet. Under this concept, Tamkang establish the thinking mode that all Tamkangians must have a global mind, global soul and global action.

Information-oriented Education
To construct the best information network and, at the same time, to actively complement the construction of hi-net so that via the network, Tamkang university is able to connect with the inter-collegiate network throughout the nation and with the international academic network throughout the world, to assist the university in instruction and research, and, more importantly, to strengthen human intelligence so as to cultivate Tamkangians to have the elements of "information with human nature" and "concern about humanity."

Future-oriented Education
Based on "integrated sciences-oriented" and "future scenario-oriented" approaches, Tamkang must establish the future "vision" of Tamkang University. The 21st century is the age of continuity and discontinuity; Tamkangians have to understand the future, adapt to the future and, furthermore, create the best created future.

Campuses
Tamkang University has accomplished its announced goal of "One Great University, Four Distinct Campuses." Managed according to a market model philosophy, academic and course arrangements are flexible. Goals are achieved through four strategies: differentiation, individualization, focus, and globalization.
The Tamsui Campus represents an American-style research university. Called "The City of Intellect," the center lays equal emphasis on both instruction and research and devoted to both master's and doctoral programs.
The Taipei Campus, called "The Sea of Knowledge Navigator", renders services such as lifelong education and continuing education as well as offering degrees, credit and non-credit courses to non-traditional students.
The Lanyang Campus, called "The Garden of Wisdom," adopts the Oxbridge residential undergraduate education approach. English is the language of all course instruction. No graduate programs are offered on this campus at present.
The Cyber Campus, called "The Space of Knowledge Explorer," provides students with flexible education at any time or place. An E-Learning Executive Master's Program in Educational Technology was established for on-the-job students in the 2006–2007 academic year. In the 2007–2008 academic year an E-Learning Executive Master's Program in Global Chinese Business Management was added for on-the-job learning by international business professionals.

Each campus offers specific functions in the realms of research, instruction, and services. A multi-disciplinary curriculum is being developed to meet the demands of students from widely varying backgrounds. The teaching resources of the four campuses remain integrated within one system.

Symbols
The Tamkang University expresses its mission and identity through a family of symbols.

Architecture at the Tamkang University emphasizes dialogue between eastern and western motifs as well as between traditional and modern styles.

Motto
The words "Simplicity, Truthfulness, Firmness, and Perseverance" appear in the university anthem and motto. This motto is understood as expressing goals in the lives of Tamkangians.

Emblem
The Tamkang University emblem, designed by artist Lan Yin-ting, evokes a giant bell associated by the ancients with timekeeping.
The Chinese characters「鐘鈴」"Chung Ling" literally mean "clock and bell." They also represent 鐘鈴」, the childhood name of Clement C. P. Chang, whose late father was Chang Ming, alias Ching-sheng. Tamkang uses the bell (鐘鈴) as university emblem to commemorate his father and carry forward the ancient tradition of big bells in education (see "Pa Yu" in Lun Yu). Confucius serves in Asian societies as an icon of educational mastery (木鐸); the bell thus shows two wings, symbolizing the spirit of "spreading the wings and flying high; soaring instantly and progressing swiftly." Engraved on the bell are two Chinese characters "Tam Kang."

Overcoming Difficulty Slope
The Overcoming Difficulty Slope is a steep stone staircase on the Tamsui campus. Built in 1953, the staircase consists of 132 stone steps. This staircase provided the only access to the school in its earliest days. Today it is taken as a symbol of the tenacity needed to gain knowledge and attain life goals.

Palace-style classroom buildings
Built in 1954, the school's first classroom buildings are modeled after Chinese classical palaces with green roofs and red walls. These evoke Confucian ideals of education.

Dolphins
The dolphin was chosen as a symbol of Tamkang University in a poll of students on all campuses. Dolphins are the most agile and intelligent mammals in the ocean and migrate all seven seas.

Lucky Dolphins Milestone Statue
In the roundabout at the top end of the Lantern Road is a work by well-known contemporary sculptor Wang Shiu-chi. Engraved on the pillar-base of the milestone are four lines of phrases that Clement C. P. Chang often used to encourage Tamkangians: "Let's establish a firm foothold at Tamkang University/ Hold the whole world in view/ Grasp the latest information/ and create a bright future."

Commons
Situated in the center of the vast compound before the Ching-sheng Memorial Hall is the University Commons edifice, built in 1986 and designed by architect Lin Kuei-jung, a Tamkang alumnus. The structures form four tablets of bamboo encircling one another, "tzu chien" that represent ancient books (tzu chien = 竹卷). Seen from above, the design suggests the pivot of a motor, turning unceasingly.

The Bronze Sculpture of the Five Tigers
Five Tiger Hill is the site of the Tamsui Campus. The Tatuen range crests at Hutou Shan (Tiger's Head Mountain) which has five ridges. Tamkang University is on the fourth ridge. A bronze sculpture on campus depicts five tigers embracing one another. The work, by Wang Shiu-chi, stands in front of the Shaomo Memorial Gymnasium and represents Tamkangians’ vitality ("Hu Hu Shen Fong"). The base features the text of Clement C. P. Chang's essay "The Five-tiger Hill: A Sketch."

Tamkang Golden Eagle Award
The Tamkang Golden Eagle Award for "Tamkang Elites" was initiated in 1987. The award recognizes Tamkangians who have made especially distinguished contributions to human society. The Award is in the form of a golden eagle spreading its wings.

Sculpture of Hsuehshan Tunnel

The Rising Sun Above Hsuehshan Tunnel (Love of Lanyang and Devotion to Tamkang): The sculpture portraying the Hsuehshan Tunnel of the Taipei-Yilan Expressway was presented to Clement C. P. Chang in 1990 by the Association for Promotion of the Taipei-Yilan Rapid Transit System.

It is the work of Zerman Hu and Lanyang master sculptor Yu Yu Yang (Yang Ying-feng) and was commissioned by the Yilan Association, Taipei Chapter. The original sculpture was made from gilded stainless steel in the form of an ancient Chinese hieroglyph "山" (shan meaning "mountain"). The sculpture portrays the Hsuehshan Tunnel, the mountain itself (Hsuehshan = Snow Mountain), the rising sun shining over Lanyang, and the Pacific Ocean.

To celebrate the completion of the Lanyang Campus and the opening of the Taipei-Yilan Expressway, the university asked Arthur Yang, son of Yu Yu Yang, to render the original sculpture as a stainless-steel artwork 241 cm high and 270 cm wide. This larger sculpture is installed at the entrance to the Clement Chang International Conference Hall on the Lanyang Campus. The sculpture pays homage to the unsung heroes who built the expressway and symbolizes the university's Tamsui-Yilan connection.

Organization

Board of trustees

President
Office of the Director of Lanyang Campus
Office of the Secretariate
Carrie Chang Fine Arts Center

Vice president for academic affairs
College of Liberal Arts
College of Science
College of Engineering (notably TU has partnership with UIUC)
College of Business
College of Management
College of Foreign Languages and Literature
College of International Studies
College of Education
College Of Entrepreneurial Development
College Of Global Research And Development
Division of Continuing Education
Office of Physical Education
Office of Military Education and Training
Division of Continuing Education

Vice president for administrative affairs
Office of Academic Affairs
Office of Student Affairs
Office of General Affairs
Office of Research and Development
Chueh-sheng Memorial Library
Information Processing Center
Center for Learning and Teaching
Personnel Office
Office of the Comptroller
Office of Alumni Services and Resources Development
Tamkang Times

Vice president for international affairs
Office of International Exchanges and International Education

Admissions
Admission to Tamkang University is selective. Requirements vary with the nature of the program and the applicants.

Undergraduate

Freshmen
Taiwan residents are admitted after undergoing open screening procedures to review qualifications and examination scores. Applicants should be either high school graduates (or the equivalent) or graduates of a 3- or 5-year vocational college.

International students apply between February 1 and May 15 for admission directly to the Admissions Section of the Office of Academic Affairs of the university or the nearest Taiwan overseas representative office.

Transfer students
The university offers limited opportunities to transfer into undergraduate programs. Admission is based on scores earned in the Entrance Examination for Transfer Students held each July at the university. International students apply directly to the Admissions or Registration Section of the Office of Academic Affairs for transfer to a department related to their previous training.

Graduate admissions

Tamkang University offers doctoral and master's degrees.

Seventeen Ph.D. degrees are offered in Chinese, English, Chemistry, Physics, American Studies, Management Sciences and Decision Making, Computer Science and Information Engineering, Water Resources and Environmental Engineering, Mathematics, Civil Engineering, Electrical Engineering, Banking and Finance, Industrial Economics, Mechanical and Electro-Mechanical Engineering, Chemical Engineering, and European Studies.

Master's degrees are offered in 49 fields including liberal arts, science, engineering, business, management, education, English, and Chinese literature.

Exchange students
Students from Tamkang's sister universities who wish to study at Tamkang University as exchange students should apply directly to the Office of International Studies of their respective university.

Ratings and awards

In the "1,000 Enterprises' Favorite College Graduates" survey, conducted by the well-known Common Wealth (Cheers) Magazine, Tamkang University was ranked number one for eleven consecutive years on the list of local private universities.
Tamkang University was designated by WHO as an International Safe School on November 18, 2008, the first among the world's universities.
The Lanyang Campus received from the Ministry of the Interior an award of "Green Building" on October 5, 2007, in recognition of the campus's environmentally friendly Building Project Phase I. The campus has also been awarded by the Executive Yuan a "Green Building" prize, which will be presented to Tamkang University during a ceremony on December 22, 2007.
Ranked 463rd place among world universities, 31st in Asia, 7th in Taiwan and 1st in Taiwanese private universities by Webometrics 2007.
At the 2006 International Federation of Library Associations and Institutions (IFLA), the poster designed by Tamkang's Department of Information and Library Science won the "Best Poster Award", making it the first in Taiwan to win such an award.
In 2005, on behalf of the MOE, the Taiwan Assessment and Evaluation Association conducted the first nationwide assessment of College Performance, and Tamkang was ranked first in the Academic Year 2003-2004 evaluation. Groups of subjects under review for Tamkang were as follows: "Humanities, Arts and Sports", "Social Sciences (including educational study)", "Natural Sciences", and "Engineering." The six criteria used for the assessment at the institutional level were: "Teaching Resources", "Degree of Internationalization, or Globalization", "Extension Education", "Student Guidance or Service", "Liberal or General Education", and "Administrative Support." Among all 76 universities and colleges being evaluated, Tamkang alone was assessed as "better" in all areas.
In the "2005 Evaluation on Institutions that Cultivate Teachers", Tamkang University's "Elementary Teacher Education Program" and "Middle School Teacher Education Program" both won the highest rating from the MOE. Again, Tamkang is the only institution that won such a distinction.
In Taiwan's first English-Friendly Environment Evaluation in 2003, the government has ranked Tamkang the number one university in the country.
In 2003, an acoustic-controlled robot football player "Forerunner", created by an Electrical Engineering Department research team, won the world championship in FIRA world competition. The robot-soccer team has also won first place in the RoboSot Competition at the 2006, 2007, and 2008 FIRA RoboWorld Cup.
In 2001, the E-business Weekly ranked Tamkang University number one in the "Digital Infrastructure Environment Evaluation of Taiwan's Universities", and called Tamkang a "Digital Heaven."
In the "1999 Evaluation on Institutions that Cultivate Teachers", Tamkang University's "Elementary Teacher Education Program" won a very excellent rating from the Ministry of Education. Earning almost full marks, TKU is the only institution that won such a distinction.
In 1999, the World Futures Studies Federation (WFSF) elected Tamkang University as one of the two universities in the world that won the "WFSF Award for Futures Institution" in recognition of Tamkang University's untiring endeavor in promoting Futures Studies in Taiwan in the past three decades.
In the evaluation of the "Comprehensive Private Universities' Medium-range Academic Development Plan", the Ministry of Education (MOE) of the Republic of China has rated Tamkang University as "Excellent" in the previous years. Tamkang was ranked first in the Academic Year 1998-1999 evaluation. In the academic year 1999-2000 evaluation, the MOE rated Tamkang University as "Excellent" in all six categories under review: "Planning and Implementation", "Instruction and Student Counseling", "Research", "Extension Education", "Administrative Management", and "Accounting Administration." In the academic year 2000–2002, Tamkang won excellent ratings in five categories.

Alumni
 Bruce Linghu, Deputy Minister of Foreign Affairs (2015-2016)
 Chang An-lo, Chairman of China Unification Promotion Party
 Chang Hsien-yao, Special Deputy Minister of Mainland Affairs Council (2013-2014)
 Chen Bang-yen, mathematician
 Crowd Lu, singer-songwriter and actor
 Dong Zhisen, journalist
 Ker Chien-ming, acting Chairperson of Democratic Progressive Party (2011)
 Fu Kun-chi, Magistrate of Hualien County (2009–2018)
 Gu Long, former novelist, screenwriter, film producer and director
 Gwei Lun-mei, actress
 Huang Chih-ta, Minister without Portfolio
 Hung Meng-chi, Minister of Culture (2014-2016)
 Irving H. C. Tai, former Deputy Minister of Research, Development and Evaluation Commission
 Janie Tsao, co-founder of Linksys
 Jocelyn Wang, actress
 Lin Teng-chiao, Administrative Deputy Minister of Education
 Lin Yu-fang, member of Legislative Yuan (2008-2016)
 Liu Shyh-fang, member of Legislative Yuan
 Lu Shiow-yen, mayor of Taichung
 Shi Shuqing, writer and educator
 Wu Maw-kuen, physicist

Alumni events
Tamkang has more than 220,000 alumni residing all over the world, contributing in all walks of life with outstanding performance. Hence, Tamkang's alumni are voted the most popular in the business industry for ten consecutive years. To present current developments and future visions of the alma mater to alumni, each year Tamkang holds the "Feast of Spring" in March, inviting local and overseas alumni back to Tamkang to revisit the garden campus and its advanced instructional facilities, attend departmental forum, and share with current students their experiences on further education or employment.

Therefore, by presenting growths and improvements, Tamkang hopes to receive further support and acknowledgement from alumni. Moreover, with the aims of creating a higher academic reputation and becoming a world-class university, support, acknowledgement, as well as donations and gifts are all important foundations for Tamkang's future developments.

See also
 List of universities in Taiwan
 EUTW university alliance
 Tsinghua Big Five Alliance
 U12 Consortium

References

External links

Official website

 
1950 establishments in Taiwan
Educational institutions established in 1950
Universities and colleges in Taiwan
Universities and colleges in Taipei
Comprehensive universities in Taiwan